Kitagata General Hospital, also Kitagata Hospital, is a hospital in the Western Region of Uganda.

Location
The coordinates of Kitagata General Hospital are: 0°40'21.0"S, 30°09'04.0"E (Latitude:-0.672503; Longitude:30.151111).

Overview
Kitagata Hospital was established in 1969 by the first government of Prime Minister Milton Obote. It has a bed capacity of 100. As with many government hospitals built at the same time, the hospital infrastructure is in a dilapidated state, with antiquated equipment.

Recent developments
In 2013, the government of Uganda acquired funds to renovate certain hospitals, including Kitagata General Hospital, using funds borrowed from the World Bank.

See also
List of hospitals in Uganda

References

External links
  Website of Uganda Ministry of Health
 Website of Sheema District Local Government

Hospitals in Uganda
Sheema District
Ankole sub-region
1969 establishments in Uganda
Hospital buildings completed in 1969
Western Region, Uganda